Bhimnagar is a village in Basantpur tehsil of Supaul district in the Indian state of Bihar, south of the Koshi Barrage, near the India-Nepal border. The village has more than 20 hours power supply through Kattaiah power house. Bhimnagar is advanced in education with an 73% literacy rate. It has a Primary Hospital which is now used as Sadar Aspatal. It has been a known place for sports like cricket, Football, Badminton and many other sports.  Bhimnagar was greatly impacted by the 2008 Bihar flood of the Kosi River.

Transport
NH 106 passes through Bhimnagar. It is well connected with the Bus services to the Patna & as well major cities in Bihar.

Bhimnagar is on India's northern border with Sunsari District, Koshi Zone, Nepal with a border crossing to Setobandha village and the (east-west) Mahendra Highway, plus a customs checkpoint for goods.  Indian and Nepalese nationals cross without restriction.

Rajbiraj Airport is the nearest airport roughly 25 KM away in nearest nepali city Rajbiraj. Shree Airlines operates daily flights between Rajbiraj and Kathmandu

Population

References

Villages in Supaul district
Transit and customs posts along the India–Nepal border